Mercedes Trujillo Callealta (born 14 June 1974 in Cádiz, Spain), best known as Merche, is a Spanish singer.

Early life
When she was a child, she acted in school plays and wished to be a singer, and received her first guitar as a gift at age six. She finished school, high school and university, and became a music teacher. At this time she sang in an orchestra named Bahia Azul, and worked as a direction assistant in Astilleros de Cádiz.

Rise to stardom
In 2001, she participated as Luna in the Spanish national final for the Eurovision Song Contest with the song "No Pidas Mas Amor". She finished in sixth place, but signed with Vale Music and start to record her first album Mi Sueño. From spring 2002 to the end of summer, the single "No Pidas Mas Amor" was a national hit in Spain, with TV appearances supporting the single and album, and was also the title track of the Spanish version of Big Brother.

"Como Pude" was released as second single, but sales were not as high as expected. In fall 2002 the third single, "Le Deseo" was released, and the album became a hit, up to No. 12 some weeks, and certificated gold, and a months later, platinum.

In the summer of 2003, the fourth single was released, "Mi Sueño", also with supporting appearances in TV.

In 2002 and 2003, Merche toured with her first album, in the Mi Sueño Tour, where she sang all songs from the album and two covers of other artists, Alaska's "A Quien Le Importa" and Ray Heredia's "Alegria de Vivir".

Personal life
Her father, Pedro also was a singer in Carnavales de Cadiz, now retired. Her mother Caty is a housewife. Merche has two sisters, one older, Maria, and one younger, Veronica who is also her personal assistant. She adopted a little girl on her own named, Ambika.

Discography
Mi sueño (2002) (Platinum)
Auténtica (2004) (Platinum)
Necesito libertad (2005) (2xPlatinum)
Cal y arena (2007) (2xPlatinum)
Acordes de mi diario (2010) (Gold)
Un mundo de colores (2012) (Gold)
Quiero contarte (2014) (Gold)
"De otra manera" (2017)
"Es Ahora" (2020)
 "20 Conmigo" (2022)

References

External links 
Official web
Fan club

1974 births
Living people
Singers from Andalusia
People from Cádiz
21st-century Spanish singers
21st-century Spanish women singers
Sony Music Spain artists
Women in Latin music